The horizon effect, also known as the horizon problem, is a problem in artificial intelligence whereby, in many games, the number of possible states or positions is immense and computers can only feasibly search a small portion of them, typically a few plies down the game tree. Thus, for a computer searching only five plies, there is a possibility that it will make a detrimental move, but the effect is not visible because the computer does not search to the depth of the error (i.e., beyond its "horizon").

When evaluating a large game tree using techniques such as minimax with alpha-beta pruning, search depth is limited for feasibility reasons. However, evaluating a partial tree may give a misleading result.  When a significant change exists just over the horizon of the search depth, the computational device falls victim to the horizon effect.

In 1973 Hans Berliner named this phenomenon, which he and other researchers had observed, the "Horizon Effect." He split the effect into two: the Negative Horizon Effect "results in creating diversions which ineffectively delay an unavoidable consequence or make an unachievable one appear achievable." For the "largely overlooked" Positive Horizon Effect, "the program grabs much too soon at a consequence that can be imposed on an opponent at leisure, frequently in a more effective form."

Greedy algorithms tend to suffer from the horizon effect.

The horizon effect can be mitigated by extending the search algorithm with a quiescence search. This gives the search algorithm ability to look beyond its horizon for a certain class of moves of major importance to the game state, such as captures in chess.

Rewriting the evaluation function for leaf nodes and/or analyzing more nodes will solve many horizon effect problems.

Example 
For example, in chess, assume a situation where the computer only searches the game tree to six plies and from the current position determines that the queen is lost in the sixth ply; and suppose there is a move in the search depth where it may sacrifice a rook, and the loss of the queen is pushed to the eighth ply. This is, of course, a worse move than sacrificing the queen because it leads to losing both a queen and a rook. However, because the loss of the queen was pushed over the horizon of search, it is not discovered and evaluated by the search. Losing the rook seems to be better than losing the queen, so the sacrifice is returned as the best option whereas delaying the sacrifice of the queen has in fact additionally weakened the computer's position.

See also
 Fog of war
 Anti-computer tactics
 Monte Carlo tree search

References

External links
 Horizon Effect at Chess Programming WIKI (CPW)

Game artificial intelligence
Computer chess